Julia Keller is an American writer and former journalist. Her awards include the Pulitzer Prize for Feature Writing.

Life
Keller was born in Huntington, West Virginia and lived there throughout her early life. Her father was a mathematics professor who taught at Marshall University. She graduated from Marshall University in Huntington, West Virginia, and earned a doctoral degree in English literature from Ohio State University. Her master's thesis was an analysis of the Henry Roth novel, Call It Sleep. Her doctoral dissertation explored multiple biographies of Virginia Woolf (A poetics of literary biography: The creation of "Virginia Woolf", Ohio State, 1996).  She currently lives in both Chicago and rural Ohio.

Career
Keller was a Nieman Fellow at Harvard University from the period of 1998 to 1999. She has taught at Princeton University, the University of Notre Dame, and the University of Chicago. She also has served four times as a juror for the Pulitzer Prizes. Her reviews and commentary air on National Public Radio and on The Newshour (PBS).

Keller began her career as a journalist as an intern for columnist Jack Anderson. She went on to work for over 25 years as a reporter for many major newspapers, including the Columbus Dispatch, The Daily Independent, and the Chicago Tribune.  She joined the staff of the Chicago Tribune in late 1998. She was formerly employed as a cultural critic for the Chicago Tribune, but left her job in 2012 to write full-time.

Keller won the annual Pulitzer Prize for Feature Writing for her three-part narrative account of the deadly Utica, Illinois tornado outbreak, published by the Chicago Tribune in April 2004. The jury called it a "gripping, meticulously reconstructed account of a deadly 10-second tornado". The Tribune has won many Pulitzers but Keller's prize was its first win for feature writing.

In 2008, Keller wrote a nonfiction book that detailed the cultural impact of the Gatling gun. In 2012, she started publishing a series of mysteries, The Bell Elkins Mysteries, that details a woman's return to Appalachia and the mysteries that abound in her home town. The first book in the series. starred reviews from Publishers Weekly, Library Journal, Kirkus, and Booklist. It was also a winner of the Barry Award for Best First Mystery.

Books

 Mr. Gatling's Terrible Marvel: The Gun That Changed Everything and the Misunderstood Genius Who Invented It (Viking, 2008) 
 Back Home (Egmont, 2009), named by Booklist as one of the top ten YA debut novels of the year

Bell Elkins mysteries
 A Killing in the Hills (Minotaur, 2012);  
 Bitter River (Minotaur, 2013) 
 Summer of the Dead (Minotaur, 2014) 
 Last Ragged Breath (Minotaur, 2015) 
 Sorrow Road (Minotaur, 2016) 
 Fast Falls the Night (Minotaur, 2017) 
 Bone on Bone (Minotaur, 2018) 
 The Cold Way Home (Minotaur, 2019)

Bell Elkins e-novellas
 The Devil's Stepdaughter (Minotaur, 2014)
 A Haunting of the Bones (Minotaur, 2014)
 Ghost Roll (Minotaur, 2015)
 Evening Street (Minotaur, 2015)

The Dark Intercept 
 The Dark Intercept (Tor Teen, 2017) 
 Dark Mind Rising (Tor Teen, 2018) 
Dark Star Calling (Tor Teen, 2019)

References

External links
 
 
 https://www.npr.org/2014/06/26/325050397/in-mystery-series-w-va-river-town-theres-no-escape-from-terror
 Biography from Chicago Women in Publishing
Writers Talk Interview
 
The story behind Bitter River - Online Essay by Julia Keller at Upcoming4.me

Living people
21st-century American novelists
American mystery writers
Pulitzer Prize for Feature Writing winners
Chicago Tribune people
Marshall University alumni
Ohio State University alumni
Writers from Huntington, West Virginia
Year of birth missing (living people)
Place of birth missing (living people)
American women journalists
Women mystery writers
American women novelists
21st-century American women writers
Novelists from West Virginia
21st-century American non-fiction writers
Barry Award winners